Papilio janaka, the tailed redbreast, is a well-marked swallowtail butterfly found in India. The species was first described by Frederic Moore and Thomas Horsfield in 1857.

Description

The tailed redbreast closely resembles Papilio bootes but differs as follows:
Male upperside; ground colour a duller more greyish black, the outer half of the hindwing darker; the elongate discal white series of spots extended into interspace 2, sometimes also into interspace 5; beyond these the dark red markings are as in P. bootes, but there is in addition a postdiscal series of red lunules, that at the tornal angle coalesces with the admarginal spot.
Underside; similar to that of P. bootes, but with the additional white spots as on the upperside, these however in many specimens are much irrorated with red scales; the red at the base of the wings are more extended than in P. bootes and continue along the dorsal margin of the hindwing in a long streak.
Female; similar to the male, but the ground colour on the upperside paler, a spot of red at the base of the forewing; the postdiscal markings on the hindwing white, only tinged with red. Underside is similar to the upperside; the red at the base of the wings continues along the dorsal margin as in the male.

Status
The species is not known to be threatened.

References

janaka